The Fairview Apartments in Ogden, Utah is a complex of buildings built in 1916.  It was listed on the National Register of Historic Places in 1987.  There are two contributing buildings in the listing.

References

Apartment buildings in Utah
Residential buildings completed in 1916
Buildings and structures in Ogden, Utah
Prairie School architecture in Utah
Residential buildings on the National Register of Historic Places in Utah
National Register of Historic Places in Weber County, Utah